A 527 organization or 527 group is a type of U.S. tax-exempt organization organized under Section 527 of the U.S. Internal Revenue Code. A 527 group is created primarily to influence the selection, nomination, election, appointment or defeat of candidates to federal, state or local public office.

Technically, almost all political committees, including state, local, and federal candidate committees, traditional political action committees (PACs), "Super PACs", and political parties are "527s". However, in common practice the term is usually applied only to such organizations that are not regulated under state or federal campaign finance laws because they do not "expressly advocate" for the election or defeat of a candidate or party.

There are no upper limits on contributions to 527s and no restrictions on who may contribute. There are no spending limits imposed on these organizations. The organizations must register with the Internal Revenue Service (IRS), publicly disclose their donors and file periodic reports of contributions and expenditures.

Because they may not expressly advocate for specific candidates or coordinate with any candidate’s campaign, many 527s are used to raise money to spend on issue advocacy and voter mobilization. Examples of 527s are Swift Boat Veterans for Truth, The Media Fund, America Coming Together, the Progress for America Voter Fund, and the Secretary of State Project.

Legal history

Internal Revenue Code section 527 was enacted as part of Public Law No. 93-625 on January 3, 1975. In the case of Buckley v. Valeo, the U.S. Supreme Court attempted to draw a limit on the extent to which campaign finance laws could regulate speech about politics. The Court's answer was that campaign finance laws could reach only party and candidate committees, organizations with the major purpose of electing candidates, or speech that "expressly advocated" the election or defeat of candidates. The determination of whether a group had the major purpose of electing candidates depended, in turn, on whether "express advocacy" was the group's primary activity. In footnote 6 of the Buckley opinion, the Court limited "express advocacy" to words and phrases such as "Smith for Congress," "elect," "defeat," or other specific calls for action to vote for or against a candidate. Thus, organizations could run ads discussing candidates and issues without being subject to campaign finance restrictions, so long as they avoided such express advocacy.

The McCain-Feingold law, also known as the Bipartisan Campaign Reform Act, extended certain campaign finance limitations to broadcast advertisements run within 60 days of a general election or 30 days of a primary election if they mentioned a candidate, regardless of whether or not they contained "express advocacy." The Supreme Court upheld the constitutionality of this provision in McConnell v. Federal Election Commission. Based on that decision, many persons urged the Federal Election Commission (FEC) to use its regulatory power to extend campaign finance laws to cover these groups. The Commission held hearings in April 2004 to determine whether or not 527s should be regulated under campaign finance rules, but concluded that the law did not cover these independent 527 organizations unless they directly advocated the election or defeat of a candidate or engaged in broadcast advertising mentioning within the 30- and 60-day windows specified by Congress in the McCain-Feingold law. Nevertheless, Federal Election Commission rulings after the 2004 election attempted to extend the reach of the law to advertisements which questioned a candidate's character and fitness for office off limits to 527s specifically.
 On September 18, 2009, the Federal Appeals Court in Washington, D.C., ruled that these groups have a First Amendment right to raise and spend freely to influence elections so long as they do not coordinate their activities with a candidate or a party.
 In January 2010, the Supreme Court held that the government may not keep corporations or unions from spending money to support or denounce individual candidates in elections. While corporations or unions may not give money directly to campaigns or coordinate their activity with campaigns, they may seek to persuade the voting public through independent expenditure groups.
 In July 2010, the U.S. District Court of Appeals for the D.C. Circuit ruling in Speechnow.org v. Federal Election Commission struck down fundraising limits on independent expenditure-only committees, (commonly known as Super PACs) which, like 527s, can raise unlimited amounts of money from individuals, unions, associations and corporations to influence elections. Speechnow.org v. Federal Election Commission, 599 F.3d 686, (U.S.C.A. D.C. 2010).  These PACs must also disclose their finances to the FEC and cannot coordinate with candidates or political parties.  The difference is that the Super PACs must "expressly advocate" for or against a candidate. The Speechnow.org and Citizens United decisions made 527s much less valuable as a medium of political communication, and their use declined substantially in the elections of 2010 and 2012 .

In Carey et al. v. FEC – RADM James J. Carey, USN (ret), chairman of the National Defense PAC, along with the PAC and a prospective donor, brought suit after the FEC deadlocked on a 2010 Advisory Opinion Request (see AO 2010-20), in which the PAC sought permission to operate both an independent expenditure PAC and a traditional PAC that could make contributions to candidates and was subject to fundraising restrictions. Carey's victory in the court now allows organizations to operate both traditional and "Super" PACs.

Public opinion
A February 2010 poll from the Pew Research Center found that 68 percent of Americans disapprove of the Supreme Court's decision to allow corporations to make expenditures on behalf of candidates during elections. Seventeen percent approve of the expenditures, and 15 percent of respondents said they were unsure.

An October 2010 Bloomberg poll found that 47 percent of Americans say they would be less likely to support a political candidate if his campaign was supported by advertising paid for by anonymous business groups. According to the pollster, 41 percent said that it would not matter, and 9 percent said they would be more likely to back the candidate.

2004 election controversy
Although 527 organizations were in common use by the 1990s, in the wake of the Bipartisan Campaign Reform Act, which limited the ability of political parties to raise money, 527s rose to much greater prominence and visibility.  Swift Boat was one such group, which ran controversial and highly effective ads critical of the 2004 Democratic Party candidate, John Kerry.  A reported $9.45 million came from just 3 private individuals.  On the liberal side, contributor George Soros contributed $23.7 million to 527s, and Peter Lewis of Progressive Insurance contributed another $23.2 million to 527s in 2004. Prominent 527s that supported Democrats included Americans Coming Together, MoveOn.org, and the Media Fund.

Under federal election law, coordination between an election campaign and a 527 group is not allowed. The heavy spending of key 527 groups to attack presidential candidates brought complaints to the Federal Elections Commission of illegal coordination between the groups and rival political campaigns. These formal complaints included:
 On May 5, 2004, the Republican National Committee accused MoveOn.org, The Media Fund, America Coming Together and America Votes of coordinating their efforts with the   John Kerry campaign.
 On August 20, 2004, John Kerry's campaign accused Swift Boat Veterans for Truth of coordinating their efforts with the George W. Bush campaign.

In 2006 and 2007 the FEC fined a number of organizations, including MoveOn and Swift Boat Veterans for Truth, for violations arising from the 2004 campaign.  The FEC's rationale was that these groups had specifically advocated the election or defeat of candidates, thus making them subject to federal regulation and its limits on contributions to the organizations.

Top 20 federally focused and state focused 527 groups

2018 election cycle 
Some of these listings identify a parent organization that has created a 527 group but that also engages in many nonpolitical activities. Republican/conservative leaning groups are highlighted in pink, Democratic/liberal leaning groups are highlighted in blue, neutral groups are not highlighted.

2010 election cycle

Some of these listings identify a parent organization that has created a 527 group but that also engages in many nonpolitical activities. Republican/conservative leaning groups are highlighted in pink, Democratic/liberal leaning groups are highlighted in blue.

A total of $415,784,148 was spent by these organizations alone, $214,580,543 of which was spent by Republican/conservative groups and $201,203,605 of which was spent by Democratic/liberal groups.

2008 election cycle

Some of these listings identify a parent organization that has created a 527 group but that also engages in many nonpolitical activities. Democratic/liberal leaning groups are highlighted in blue, Republican/conservative leaning groups are highlighted in pink.

A total of $303,309,245 was spent by these organizations alone, $178,397,267 of which was spent by Democratic/liberal groups and $117,112,322 of which was spent by Republican/conservative groups.

2006 election cycle

Some of these listings identify a parent organization that has created a 527 group but that also engages in many nonpolitical activities. Democratic/liberal leaning groups are highlighted in blue, Republican/conservative leaning groups are highlighted in pink.

A total of $171,045,165 was spent by these organizations alone, $121,665,587 of which was spent by Democratic/liberal groups and $49,379,578 of which was spent by Republican/conservative groups.

2004 election cycle
Some of these listings identify a parent organization that has created a 527 group but that also engages in many nonpolitical activities. Democratic/liberal leaning groups are highlighted in blue, Republican/conservative leaning groups are highlighted in pink.

A total of $439,709,105 was spent by these organizations alone, $307,324,096 of which was spent by Democratic/liberal groups and $132,385,009 of which was spent by Republican/conservative groups.

*Joint Victory Campaign 2004 is a joint fund-raising committee run by America Coming Together and the Media Fund. Money raised by JVC is divided between these two beneficiaries. Combining receipts for these three groups would result in double-counting.

See also
 501(c)(3)
 501(c)(4)
 Campaign finance in the United States
 Campaign finance reform in the United States
 Issue versus express advocacy
 Opposition research
 Political action committee

References

External links
 527s: Advocacy Group Spending in the 2010 Elections from OpenSecrets
 Top 50 Federally Focused Organizations
 Silent Partners (527 Organizations) from Center for Public Integrity, publicintegrity.org
 Tax Information for Political Organizations from the Internal Revenue Service, irs.gov
 "RNC opens assault on anti-Bush groups", CNN.com, May 6, 2004
 "Kerry files FEC complaint against swift boat group", CNN.com, August 21, 2004

0527
 
Campaign finance in the United States